Lake Madison is a natural lake in South Dakota, in the United States.

Lake Madison was named after Madison, Wisconsin, as was the nearby city of Madison, South Dakota.

See also
List of lakes in South Dakota

References

Lakes of South Dakota
Lakes of Day County, South Dakota